Wong is a fictional character appearing in American comic books published by Marvel Comics. He is the sidekick and valet of Doctor Strange, the Sorcerer Supreme of Earth. Wong first appeared in the comic Strange Tales #110 (July 1963) but was unnamed until Strange Tales #119. In the 2006 miniseries Dr. Strange: the Oath, it was revealed that Wong stems from a family of monks living in Kamar-Taj. He has a cousin currently in training in the occult and has talked to him about one day replacing Wong as a servant to Dr. Strange.

The character was portrayed by Clyde Kusatsu in the 1978 television film Dr. Strange. 

Benedict Wong portrays the character in the Marvel Cinematic Universe films Doctor Strange (2016), Avengers: Infinity War (2018), Avengers: Endgame (2019), Shang-Chi and the Legend of the Ten Rings (2021), Spider-Man: No Way Home (2021), and Doctor Strange in the Multiverse of Madness as well as the Disney+ series She-Hulk: Attorney at Law (both 2022). Additionally, he voices an alternate timeline version in the Disney+ animated series What If...? (2021)

Fictional character biography

Wong is the descendant and look-alike of Kan, a Chinese monk who lived roughly one thousand years ago and was a student of the occult. Kan was also a teacher and a healer, and though his order of monks was devoted to the ways of peace, he was also a skillful warrior who would fight when necessary.

One day Kan discovered a strange temple. Exploring it, Kan was drawn against his will through a mystical black mirror into an other-dimensional realm. There Kan met Jehan, king of Siridar, his sister, Princess Shialmar, and their court magician, Vung, the one who had cast the spell drawing Kan through the mirror. Jehan persuaded Kan to lead his people in a war against the Wizard Kings who ruled this other-dimensional realm. Kan agreed to do so. During his time in this realm, Kan and Shialmar fell in love with each other.

Ultimately Kan led his forces to complete victory over the forces of the Wizard Kings, and all but one of the Wizard Kings were killed. But Kan did not realize he was a pawn in Vung's secret plans. Vung captured both Kan and Shialmar and prepared to sacrifice them to the demonic race he secretly served, the N'Garai. Shialmar offered the N'Garai her own soul in exchange for power. The N'garai complied, transforming Shialmar into the Shadowqueen, a sorceress of great mystical power who was nearly incapable of love. The Shadowqueen slew Vung and sent Kan back to China.

Back on Earth, Kan returned to the life of a priest. Kan deeply regretted aiding Vung in defeating the Wizard Kings and sought to atone by devoting his life and those of his first-born male descendants to the service of mystics who themselves serve the forces of good. Ever since then, the firstborn males of Wong's family have carried on this tradition. For the ten generations preceding Wong's, the first-born males have served the Ancient One, the former sorcerer supreme of the Earth dimension. The last of the members of Wong's family to serve the Ancient One was Wong's own father, Hamir the Hermit, who remained with the Ancient One up to the time of the latter's death.

Wong was born in Kamar-Taj, the first-born son of Hamir, and thus his life was dedicated to the Ancient One from earliest childhood. When Wong was four years old, Hamir presented him to the Ancient One. Subsequently, Wong was sent to a remote monastery to become a student of the martial and mystic arts of Kamar-Taj, and receive training in how to serve a master sorcerer. Wong's relatives were allowed to visit him on occasions. Shortly before Wong's tenth birthday, Hamir brought a young couple to the monastery to visit Wong and made a marriage pact with them, betrothing Wong to their as yet unborn daughter. During his training at the monastery, Wong mastered certain Eastern martial arts. He remains highly adept in the martial arts, although since actually becoming a servant he no longer practices them as much as he once did.

When Wong reached adulthood, the Ancient One sent him to the United States to become a servant of his disciple, Doctor Stephen Strange. Wong was the first member of his family to come to America. Wong has now served Strange loyally and well for many years. During that time Strange has succeeded the Ancient One as sorcerer supreme of the Earth dimension.

Strange's secretary, Sara Wolfe, became strongly attracted to Wong, who began to reciprocate her feelings. However, Wong put an end to what might have become a romance with Wolfe when he was notified that Imei Chang, the woman to whom he was betrothed, had at last come of age to be married.

At one point Wong was turned into a vampire by Dracula; he was soon restored to humanity by Doctor Strange. Wong was later abducted by other-dimensional sorcerers to the realm that was still ruled by the Shadowqueen. Doctor Strange followed Wong there and rescued him from the Shadowqueen's dungeon. Wong helped Strange battle the Shadowqueen, who finally perished. Wong was then attacked by a N'Garai demon.

Wong and the empath, Topaz, were both abducted to another planet by the alien sorcerer, Urthona, when the latter used his magical powers to steal Doctor Strange's house and the mystical talismans and books it contained. Urthona even viciously mutilated Wong's face while holding him prisoner. Strange defeated Urthona and rescued Wong and Topaz. Back on Earth, Topaz used her healing powers to restore Wong's face to normalcy.

In order to rescue Wong and Topaz, Strange had found it necessary to unleash mystical forces that, he believed, destroyed the mystical talismans and books that Urthona had stolen, thus preventing Urthona from using them for evil purposes (In actuality unknown to Strange, the books and talismans were not destroyed but were instead spirited away by the mystical entity, Agamotto. ). The disappearance of these talismans from the Earth dimension broke certain ancient spells holding various mystical menaces in check.

Strange subsequently cast a spell causing the population of the world, including Wong and Sara Wolfe, to believe him dead. As a result, Wong and Wolfe perceived Strange as a man named Stephen Sanders. Strange made Wong and Wolfe the joint administrators and co-directors of the Stephen Strange Memorial Metaphysical Institute, an institution for research into the occult. Strange then embarked on a long quest during which he succeeded in defeating a number of the menaces that the disappearance of the talismans had unleashed, most notably Shuma-Gorath.

Following the defeat of Shuma-Gorath, Strange returned to New York City and released Wong and Sara Wolfe from his spell. Realizing that Strange was not dead, Wong and Wolfe regained their full memory of him and warmly welcomed him back; Wong was also reunited with Imei Chang. Since then, the general populace has also learned that Doctor Strange is still alive and Strange has regained his missing talismans and books.

When Imei was apparently altered into a hideous demon by one of Strange's enemies, Wong hoped that Strange would be able to help her. Strange was having problems of his own at the time, and Wong took this as a sign that Strange wouldn't be able to help Imei. This resulted in the first friction between the Sorcerer Supreme and his old friend.  Finally, Strange managed to redirect some attention to this matter; the magical probe revealed that the demon just acted like Imei. In fact he discovered that it wasn't Imei at all, but only a construct that was made to believe it was and that the true Imei had been killed. Although Wong is as yet unmarried and childless, he has stated that his first-born son will follow the family tradition of serving a mystic devoted to good.

Wong's father is Hamir the Hermit, the former valet to Doctor Strange's mentor, the Ancient One. Hamir still tends the Tibetan monastery as the Ancient One's spiritual successor (while Dr. Strange was the Ancient One's mystical successor).

Wong traveled to America to serve as both bodyguard and valet to the doctor. He has faithfully served Doctor Strange through many adventures, such as when Strange led the Defenders, Secret Defenders and partly through his leadership of the Midnight Sons. 

Wong almost loses his life when he was kidnapped and mauled by a brutal, alien sorcerer. Wong was one of the very few outside, involved entities to the Infinity Gauntlet incident, though he initially perceives it as a troubling dream or vision.

Romances and relationships
Sara Wolfe, Strange's neighbor and old friend, enters Wong's life. Ancient demons called 'Eye Killers' slay Wolfe's boyfriend Douglas Royce. Strange later encounters the monsters in battle. Wolfe eventually becomes Strange's secretary and becomes involved romantically with Wong.

Wong has also been romantically involved with Imei, a woman betrothed to him when he was much younger. After many adventures with Wong and Dr. Strange, Imei perishes, killed by Sister Nil. This is during a difficult battle when Strange is faced with a choice of saving Imei, or saving many others. He did not choose Imei. This incident causes Wong to become mentally unhinged. For a while he operates as a staunch opponent of Strange, even those who might be Strange as for some time Stephen operated under multiple identities. Wong, allying himself with what he believed to be Imei, kidnapped the real Strange to bring him to the ancient demoness Salome. She was defeated. The two eventually make their peace, which involves traveling to another dimension so Wong can make his goodbyes to the real Imei's spirit. They re-establish their old relationship, though now both try to treat each other as equals, instead of master and servant.

New Avengers
Wong has been a supporting character in the pages of New Avengers, after the events of the "Civil War". Many superheroes who did not wish to register with the government go on the run and Strange opens his home to them. Wong adapts to serving them and later, Strange's new love interest, the Night Nurse. Around this time, Wong develops cancer, and Strange goes on a magical quest that results in a cure. In this same period, Wong is making a shopping trip in New York on Christmas Eve when he encounters a terrorist Hydra cell endangering civilians. His courage in confronting the villains alone causes the human-hating dragon, Fin Fang Foom to assist Wong. After the threat is neutralized, Wong tries to invite the dragon back to the Sanctum but is turned down.

Doctor Strange becomes injured after self-confessed unwise use of dark magics.  Returning home, the New Avengers are set upon by the Hood's super-villain army. When Doctor Strange is attacked and shot by the Hood, Wong beats him back. The supervillain army's defeat damages the Sanctum enough so that S.H.I.E.L.D. is able to take over. Doctor Strange leaves on a road trip. Wong's whereabouts are unclear. It is later shown he is in the running for the new position of Sorcerer Supreme, but the duties later go to Brother Voodoo.

Wong resurfaced at the behest of Doctor Strange to serve as the New Avengers' housekeeper. After the "Fear Itself" storyline, multiple heroes reorganize themselves at the Avengers Mansion; Wong is angry at this, threatening the butler Jarvis if the man interferes with his kitchen. Wong later goes into hiding at the behest of Doctor Strange, who is being pursued by a murderous spirit. Wong also assists Strange and Deadpool in battling evil versions of dead American Presidents.

Back to Bleecker Street
Strange later re-establishes himself at his Bleecker Street Sanctorum. Wong moves back in to provide his essential services. Some of which, as he states to one of Strange's patients are "Chef, housekeeper, martial arts instructor, mystical guardian and insatiable adventurer". It is later established that Wong has been keeping a secret life from Strange. To keep unstable magics from harming the Sorcerer Supreme, Wong has established a willing sect of magical practitioners that take the magical harm upon themselves. Strange believes unstable magics are neutralized by confusing visits to the basement of his Sanctum Sanctorum.

During the "Damnation" storyline, Wong was approached by the ghost of Doctor Strange's talking dog Bats so that he can help Doctor Strange at the time when Mephisto has established Hotel Inferno in Las Vegas. To help Doctor Strange, Wong summoned Blade, Doctor Voodoo, Elsa Bloodstone, Ghost Rider, Iron Fist, and Man-Thing. While Wong has assembled a team made up of those he has summoned, they were overpowered by the demons roaming around Las Vegas. This attack got Wong and Bats' ghost separated from the rest. They ran into Doctor Strange's Ghost Rider form. When Mephisto was defeated, Wong remained at Hotel Inferno to keep an eye on its casino.

During the "Death of Doctor Strange" storyline, Wong makes Doctor Strange some coffee before he takes Bats' ghost for a walk. When Wong and Bats find Doctor Strange dead, Zelma and Doctor Voodoo try to detect his spirit as Baron Mordo and Kaecilius arrive. As Wong accuses Baron Mordo of killing Doctor Strange with Kaecilius prepared to fight Wong, Baron Mordo states that he didn't kill Doctor Strange and that somebody stole the opportunity from him. Just then, a classic version of Doctor Strange arrives having sensed that the worst has happened and asks what year is it. When Classic Doctor Strange catches a falling Clea, Wong briefs her on what happened to Doctor Strange. Clea states to him and everyone present that the inter-dimensional warlords like Aggamon, Dagoth, Tiboro, and Umar are fleeing from the Three Mothers. When the Three Mothers arrive, Wong witnesses the Avengers' disastrous fight with them before the Three Mothers retreat vowing to come back for them later.

Powers and abilities
Wong is a master martial artist, having achieved mastery in the martial arts of Kamar-Taj, and is capable of incapacitating all manner of terrestrial foe with speed and efficiency. Moreover, he is well-acquainted with the dark arts. Wong can hold his own against mystical forces, having developed enough competence at sorcery to be considered a candidate for Sorcerer Supreme at one point.

Reception

Accolades 

 In 2021, CBR.com ranked Wong 2nd in their "10 Smartest Marvel Sidekicks" list and 7th in their "10 Strongest Marvel Sidekicks" list.
 In 2021, Screen Rant included Wong in their "20 Most Powerful Marvel Magic Users (Who Aren’t Doctor Strange)" list.
 In 2022, Collider included Wong in their "10 Strongest Superhero Sidekicks in Marvel Comics" list.

Other versions

Earth X
In the dystopian future of Earth X, Dr. Strange's astral form has been slain by Clea. Wong takes care of Strange's body. However Wong himself had been altered by the Terrigen Mists unleashed across the planet. This left him open to manipulation by Mephisto, who promised Wong a world that  works against Strange's interest.

Marvel Adventures
Jason Wong was a friend of Stephen Strange from his college years. Strange suffered a severe mental breakdown after his car accident and Wong became his caretaker. After multiple doctors could not help, Wong took Strange to a man he knew called the 'Ancient One'. Strange's mental illnesses were slowly healed with rudimentary magic-based meditation techniques. In the process, Wong and the Ancient One became fast friends. They later moved to Strange's Bleecker Street Sanctum Sanctorum where they sometimes enjoy competitive video game sessions.

Marvel Zombies
In Marvel Zombies vs. The Army of Darkness #3, Wong, while alone in the Sanctum, gives shelter to the bitten and turned Doctor Druid. Despite the man's attempt to control his hunger, he kills and devours Wong.

Season One
Wong is presented as an equal, yet headstrong disciple to the Ancient One. When he learns of several relics capable of commanding the powerful Vishanti entities, he ventures out from the monastery to secure them. Before and during this adventure, he mentors Stephen Strange in aspects of self-defense and magical arts. Though he is tempted by the vast power gained by control of the relics, he willingly gives them up.

Strange (2004–2005)
In this limited series, Wong is introduced as a young Tibetan boy who was rendered mute after witnessing the slaughter of his family at the age of four. Several years later Stephen Strange, a medical student volunteering in Tibet, fixes his broken arm and lends him a watch. This act of kindness restores his ability to speak. He decides to travel to America and study medicine where he opens an orthopedic clinic under the name "Stephen Wong." At some point, he also joins the Ancient One and trains in both magic and martial arts. After injuring his hands, Dr. Strange visits his clinic in hope that he can restore full mobility to his hands. There, Strange learns that Wong and Clea are trained mystical warriors serving the Ancient One, working to keep him alive. He joins Clea and the inexperienced Doctor Strange against the assembled forces of Baron Mordo and Dormammu. After the defeat of their enemies, Wong, unsure if it is a 'good thing', willingly takes the position as Strange's servant.

Ultimate Marvel
Wong also made several appearances in the Ultimate Universe, where he was once again a servant to Dr. Strange, Junior.

In other media

Television
 Wong appeared in Dr. Strange, portrayed by Clyde Kusatsu.
 Wong appeared in the 1990s Spider-Man series, voiced by George Takei. This version wields two mystically enhanced swords.
 Wong made non-speaking cameo appearances in The Super Hero Squad Show.

Film

 Wong appears in Doctor Strange: The Sorcerer Supreme, voiced by Paul Nakauchi. This version has a full head of grey hair, is a master sorcerer, and serves as Doctor Strange's mentor.

Marvel Cinematic Universe

Benedict Wong portrays Wong in media set in the Marvel Cinematic Universe. This version is one of Stephen Strange's teachers rather than a servant as well as the librarian of Kamar-Taj who eventually becomes the Sorcerer Supreme. Additionally, he does not perform any martial arts and is nearly humorless, with this deadpan attitude serving as comic relief. Wong is introduced in the live-action film Doctor Strange (2016), and makes further appearances in the live-action films Avengers: Infinity War (2018), Avengers: Endgame (2019), Shang-Chi and the Legend of the Ten Rings (2021), Spider-Man: No Way Home (2021) and Doctor Strange in the Multiverse of Madness (2022). as well as the live-action Disney+ series She-Hulk: Attorney at Law. Furthermore, Wong voices alternate timeline versions of the character in the Disney+ animated series What If...? (2021).

Video games
 Wong appears as a non-playable character in Marvel: Ultimate Alliance, voiced by Michael Hagiwara.
 Wong appears in Marvel: Future Fight.
 Wong is a playable character in Marvel Avengers Academy, voiced by Nicholas Andrew Louie.
 Wong is a playable character in Lego Marvel Super Heroes 2, voiced by Dan Li.

References

External links
Wong at Marvel.com
Wong at MarvelDirectory.com

Characters created by Stan Lee
Characters created by Steve Ditko
Chinese superheroes
Comics characters introduced in 1963
Fictional bodyguards
Fictional immigrants to the United States
Fictional servants
Fictional valets
Fictional wizards
Marvel Comics characters who use magic
Marvel Comics male superheroes
Marvel Comics martial artists
Marvel Comics sidekicks